Mark Cesark (born September 16, 1965, in Summit, New Jersey) is an American sculptor, best known for his use of found and scrap steel.

Cesark, from Summit, New Jersey, earned his undergraduate degree from Alfred University in New York in 1989.  Afterward, he completed a Master of Fine Arts at the Massachusetts College of Art in Boston.

Cesark scavenges junk yards and farms looking for interesting pieces of steel, which he assembles into his wall sculptures. Irony plays a part in his art, as that has been discarded and lost is now revived into art.

His greatest influences are Mark Rothko, Jackson Pollock, and other post-war movements and artists.  Cesark's minimalist works hide their humble materials.

Cesark's work can be found in several collections, including the DeCordova Museum in Lincoln, Massachusetts. His one-person exhibitions include the Adelson Gallery of the Aspen Institute in 1998, and Barbara Singer Fine Arts in Cambridge, Massachusetts in 1993.

Cesark resides in Colorado with his wife Katherine and two children, Niko and Owen.

See also

 Scrap
 Recyclable waste

References

External links
 Mark Cesark
  photo of Hollow at DeCordova Museum and Sculpture Park
 Photo gallery of works in a 2007 exhibition - Artnet
 Review of 2002 exhibition in Denver

1965 births
Living people
20th-century American sculptors
Alfred University alumni
Massachusetts College of Art and Design alumni
People from Summit, New Jersey
21st-century American sculptors